Weyer is a municipality in the district of Steyr-Land in the Austrian state of Upper Austria.

Geography
The municipality consists of three villages: Kleinreifling, Unterlaussa, and Weyer.

References

Cities and towns in Steyr-Land District